Wokingham  is a market town in Berkshire, England,  west of London,   southeast of Reading,  north of Camberley and  west of Bracknell.

History 

Wokingham means 'Wocca's people's home'.  Wocca was apparently a Saxon chieftain who may also have owned lands at Wokefield in Berkshire and Woking in Surrey. In Victorian times, the name became corrupted to Oakingham, and consequently the acorn with oak leaves is the town's heraldic charge, granted in the 19th century. Geologically, Wokingham sits at the northern end of the Bagshot Formation, overlying London clay, suggesting a prehistorical origin as a marine estuary.  The courts of Windsor Forest were held at Wokingham and the town had the right to hold a market from 1219. The Bishop of Salisbury was largely responsible for the growth of the town during this period. He set out roads and plots making them available for rent. There are records showing that in 1258 he bought the rights to hold three town fairs every year. 

Queen Elizabeth granted a town charter in 1583. From the 14th to the 16th centuries, Wokingham was well known for its bell foundry which supplied many churches across the South of England. During the Tudor period, Wokingham was well known as a producer of silk. Some of the houses involved in these cottage industries are still to be seen in Rose Street. The houses with the taller ground floors housed the looms. This can be seen from the position of the exterior beams of the houses. It is said that one of the original mulberry bushes (favourite food of the silk worm), still remains in one of the gardens. In the years 1643–44 Wokingham was regularly raided by both sides in the Civil War. These raids would involve the looting of livestock and trading goods, and over thirty buildings were burnt down, accounting for nearly 20% of buildings in the town at that time. It was not until the early 18th century that Wokingham had fully recovered.

Wokingham was once famous for its bull-baiting. In 1661 George Staverton left a bequest in his will giving two bulls to be tethered in the Market Place and baited by dogs on St. Thomas' Day (21 December) each year. The bulls were paraded around the town a day or two before the event and then locked in the yard of the original Rose Inn which was situated on the site of the present-day Superdrug store. People travelled from miles around to see the dangerous spectacle. A number of dogs would be maimed or killed during the event and the bulls were eventually destroyed. The meat and leather were distributed amongst the poor people of the town. Some of the spectators also sustained fatal injuries. In 1794 on the morning after the bull-baiting Elizabeth North was found dead and covered with bruises. In 1808, 55-year-old Martha May died after being hurt by fighters in the crowd. The cruel 'sport' was prohibited by the Corporation in 1821 but bulls were still provided at Christmas and the meat distributed to the poor. Bull-baiting was banned by Act of Parliament in 1833.

In 1723, the 'Black Act' was passed in Parliament to make it an offence to black one's face to commit criminal acts. It was named after an infamous band of ruffians, known as the 'Wokingham Blacks', who terrorised the local area until 29 of them were arrested after fighting a pitched battle with Grenadier Guards in Bracknell. The formerly important industry of brick-making has given way to software development, light engineering and service industries, and the population has greatly increased.

Governance 

Northern Wokingham, centred on Ashridge, was, archaically, a detached part of Wiltshire. This area extended well into the town centre (and the area currently where the Dowlesgreen, Norreys and Bean Oak estates currently are situated) until transferred to Berkshire in 1844. The ancient parish was divided in 1894 into urban and rural civil parishes, Wokingham Without forming the latter. Wokingham was one of the boroughs left unreformed by the Municipal Corporations Act 1835, and was reformed subsequently in 1883. Wokingham merged with the Wokingham Rural District in 1974 under the Local Government Act 1972 to form the non-metropolitan district of Wokingham, which has been a unitary authority area since 1998. It consists of 54 elected councillors and is presided over by one councillor who is elected annually to be the chairman of the council. 

Elections to the council are held in three out of every four years. In May 2022, the Conservative party lost it’s majority on the Borough Council and since then the council has been run by the Liberal Democrats in partnership with Labour and Independent councillors. The Borough Council Offices are based at Shute End in the town of Wokingham. A successor parish continued in existence in Wokingham and is governed by Wokingham Town Council. The council is elected every four years and consists of twenty-five councillors representing Emmbrook, Evendons, Norreys and Wescott, the four wards of the town. Every year, they elect one of their number as mayor. Wokingham Town Hall was erected on the site of the old guildhall in 1860. The Wokingham constituency's MP is the Conservative John Redwood, who has represented it since 1987.

Geography 

It sits between the larger towns of Reading and Bracknell and was originally in a band of agricultural land on the western edge of Windsor Forest. The soil is a rich loam with a subsoil of sand and gravel. Wokingham has a town centre, with main residential areas radiating in all directions. These include Woosehill to the west, Emmbrook to the northwest, Dowlesgreen, Norreys, Keephatch and Bean Oak to the east, and to the south Wescott and Eastheath. Older names include Woodcray and Luckley Green.

Much of Wokingham has been developed over the past 80 years. Woosehill and Dowlesgreen were built on farmland in the late 1960s and early '70s, along with Bean Oak. Keephatch was built in the early '90s. The Norreys Estate was built in the 1960s; however, Norreys Avenue is the oldest residential road in that area, having been built in the late 1940s as emergency housing following the Second World War. Norreys Avenue has a horseshoe shape and occupies the site of the demolished Norreys Manor. Much of the road contains 1940s-style prefabricated houses, although there are some brick houses along with three blocks of 1950s police houses.

In 2010, the council set up WEL (Wokingham Enterprise Limited) to manage a £100m regeneration project to redevelop the town centre with new retail, leisure and residential facilities, parking, roads and open spaces. Several major expansion projects around the town are planned over the next decade, including a major redevelopment of the town centre, new north and south relief roads and at the former military base at nearby Arborfield Garrison. As of 2015, the redevelopment of the railway station and surrounding area is complete, and large scale housing construction is underway to the north-east and south-east of the town.

Transport 
The A329(M) motorway, accessible from the east of town, connects Wokingham to Reading and the rest of the motorway network at junction 10 of the M4. The Wokingham junction is where the A329(M) ends and becomes the A322, for Bracknell and the M3. 

Wokingham railway station is at the junction of the Waterloo to Reading line with the North Downs Line. South Western Railway manages the station and provides services, along with Great Western Railway. 

Most local bus services are provided by Thames Valley Buses, but the services from Wokingham to Reading and Bracknell are operated by Reading Buses, after First Berkshire & The Thames Valley closed their Bracknell depot in the summer of 2015. There is also a football bus run on Reading FC match days by Stagecoach South to the Madejski Stadium.

Institutions

Charities 
 The redundant Lucas Hospital, almshouses founded in 1663 for sixteen elderly men from the surrounding parishes.
 Wokingham United Charities providing grants to people living within the Wokingham area relieving poverty, hardship, and distress. Also providing sheltered accommodation for local people.

Churches 

All Saints' Church (CofE). Now a Grade 2* listed historic building. Founded in 1180 as a chapel-of-ease from Sonning. Extensively re-built in the late 15th century and restored and expanded in the mid-19th century.
 Corpus Christi Catholic Church
 St. Paul's Church (CofE), built by John Walter III in 1864
 Wokingham Baptist Church
 Wokingham Methodist Church
 Christ Church Wokingham (CofE). Officially The Church at the White House, Christ Church is not a church building but an extra-parochial congregation currently meeting temporarily in hired premises.
 Woosehill Community Church
 Norreys Church
 Kings Church Wokingham

Manors 

 Evendon's Manor
 Ashridge Manor (now in Hurst, Berkshire)
 Beche's Manor (burnt down 1953)
 Buckhurst Manor (now St. Anne's Manor)
 Norreys' Manor (demolished long ago, now Norreys Avenue)

Other buildings of note
 Keep Hatch House (Built 1871–74, demolished late 1990s due to dereliction to make way for the Keephatch housing estate)

Education

Secondary schools 

Wokingham is served by five state secondary schools. The Emmbrook School is a mixed-sex comprehensive school, St Crispin's School is a mixed-sex comprehensive school. The Holt School, founded in 1931 in the Dower House of Beche's Manor, is a girls' school.

Private schools 
 Holme Grange School founded in 1945 for Girls and Boys aged 3–16 years
 Luckley House School founded at Luckley House in 1918 for girls aged 11–18
  White House Preparatory School, for girls aged 2–11, now closed

Junior School
Westende Junior School is a co-educational junior school established in 1974. The school caters for children from the ages of seven to eleven. The school is near the town centre in Seaford Road and is bordered by St Crispin's School and the King George V playing field. The majority of children at Westende come from the nearby Wescott Infant School, and the two schools share a joint Parent Teachers' Association. In September 1995 the school opened ‘The Acorns’, the first junior school resource in Berkshire for pupils with a diagnosis of Special Educational Need for autism spectrum disorders (ASD).

Literature 

In the 18th century, the Ballad of Molly Mogg was written in Wokingham. Molly was the barmaid daughter of the publican of the old Rose Inn (not on the site of the present one). She was well known to local Binfield man, Alexander Pope, who, during a storm, found himself stranded at the inn with his friends, Gay, Swift and Arbuthnot. They wrote the ballad extolling her virtues to pass the time. Wokingham is the setting of Lars Iyer's 2019 novel Nietzsche and the Burbs. The character of Tom the chimney sweep in Charles Kingsley's classic childhood story The Water Babies was based on the life and times of a Wokingham boy called James Seaward, who was a boy sweep in Victorian times. In his later years, Seaward swept the chimneys at Charles Kingsley's home at the Rectory in Eversley, Hampshire. Seaward was elected Alderman of Wokingham from 1909 until his death in 1921. He had 12 children. The Water Babies are the subject of Wokingham's first public sculpture, installed in 1999, which graces the upper-level entrance to Wokingham Library.

Film 
The 1971 film See No Evil, also released under the title Blind Terror, was filmed in and around Wokingham, with scenes shot at the since-redeveloped Wokingham railway station. Scenes for ITV series Primeval were filmed at Wokingham's Red Lion pub.

Sport and leisure 
 There are public parks at Barkham Road Recreation Ground, Langborough Recreation Ground, Cantley Park, Chestnut Park, Elizabeth Road Recreation Ground, Elms Field, Riverside Walk, and Waverley Park.
 There is a local nature reserve called Holt Copse & Joel Park.
 The council provides a number of leisure facilities such as the Carnival Hub, St. Crispin's Sports Centre and the Pinewood Leisure Centre. Pinewood is the base for over 20 clubs and associations. There is a King George V Playing Field behind St. Crispin's in memory of King George V.
 Speedway racing was staged at California in Reading. Before then the track, known then as Longmoor was used as a training track. After the war the track featured in the Southern Area League in the 1950s. The team were known as the Poppies. The site of the stadium is now part of a nature reserve but a few remnants of the track remain.
 The local football team is Wokingham and Emmbrook F.C.
 The Wokingham Half Marathon is held each February and starts and finishes at Cantley Park.
 Wokingham Library is now located in the Carnival Hub leisure centre having relocated from Denmark Street in September 2022.
 Wokingham Cricket Club (founded 1825) played at their ground on Wellington Road before relocating to a new, bigger ground in Sindlesham in 2012.
 Wokingham Music, Food & Drink Festival is held every August. Showcasing local musicians, local food producers and also wines, beers, and ciders from Berkshire and surrounding breweries.
 Wokingham Open Air Cinema. For its second year, three films were shown the weekend before the Wokingham Festival.

Twin towns 
Wokingham is twinned with:

  — Erftstadt in Germany
  — Viry-Châtillon in France

Notable people 

 Matt Allwright, TV presenter
 Luke Bedford, composer
 Thomas Bradley, chaplain to King Charles I
 Sir Richard Browne, 1st Baronet, of London, born in Wokingham sometime prior to 1616
 Kate Bryan, arts broadcaster
 The Cooper Temple Clause, post-hardcore punk band
 Isaac Deutscher, Polish historian and political activist, lived in Wokingham from the late 1950s to 1963.
 Claude Duval, highwayman, supposedly owned a house in the town
 Dick Francis, writer
 Thomas Godwin, Bishop of Bath and Wells, born and died in Wokingham
 Nicholas Hoult, actor and model, best known for his roles in the films About a Boy (2002) portraying Marcus, X-Men: First Class (2011) portraying Hank McCoy and for portraying Tony Stonem in the E4 drama series Skins (2007–2008)
 Daniel Howell, YouTuber, author and former BBC Radio 1 presenter
 Stephen Hughes, footballer, born in Wokingham
 Diane Kendal, makeup artist
 Steven Lewington, professional wrestler formerly known as "The British Babe", now wrestling as "DJ Gabriel" with WWE
 Frederick Lucas, founder of The Tablet
 Henry Lucas, founder of the Lucasian Professorship of Mathematics at Cambridge University
 Leslie Sears, cricketer
 Russell Slade, football manager
 Anne Snelgrove, MP
 Bill Stone, veteran of both World Wars; lived in Sindlesham
 William Talman, architect and landscape designer
 Mark Tildesley, murdered in Wokingham, on 1 June 1984, at the age of seven
 John Walter III, local benefactor and proprietor of The Times newspaper
 Anna Watkins, gold medallist at the 2012 London Olympics and bronze medallist at the Beijing Olympics in 2008 in the women's double sculls
 Jason Watkins, actor
 Will Young, singer and Pop Idols Series 1 (2002) winner

References

Bibliography 

 Goatley, K. Wokingham: The Town of my Life. Reading: Conservatree Print and Design, 2004. .
 The Wokingham Society. Wokingham: A Chronology, 1978.
 Wyatt, B. Wokingham in Old Photographs. Stroud, Gloucestershire: Budding Books, 1999. .
 Harison, J. Living Heritage – 300 years of bells, ringing and bellringers at All Saints Wokingham, 2009. .
 Bell, J. "Memories of Wokingham Town Hall 1860 to 1946"
 Bell, J. "Wokingham and the Royal Jubilees"
 Bell, J. "Former Mayors of Wokingham 1885 to 1946"
 Bell, J. "Former Mayors of Wokingham 1947 to 1979"
 Bell, J. "A Stroll Through St. Paul´s Churchyard"
 Bell, J. "St. Paul´s Wokingham - Early 20th Century Parish Magazine Extracts"
 Bell, J. "St. Paul´s Parish Wokingham at War 1939-1945"
 Bell, J. "the Memorials Inside All Saints' Parish Church"
 Bell, J. "the Story of H.M.S. Garth"
 Bell, J. "St. Paul´s Parish Church, Wokingham"
 Bell, J. "Miss Winifred Spooner, Aviatrix"
 Bell, J. "Wokingham Remembers the Second World War"
 Bell, J. "High Stewards of Wokingham"
 Bell, J. "Five Wokingham Families"
 Bell, J. "Former Town Clerks of Wokingham"

External links 

 Wokingham Town Council
 Wokingham Borough Council
 Westende Junior School website

 
Market towns in Berkshire
Civil parishes in Berkshire
Towns in Berkshire